The International Association of Ultrarunners (IAU) is the world governing body of ultra running, race events longer than the marathon distance of 42.2 km. It regulates and sanctions the World Championships for various ultramarathon distances, and tracks world records in ultra distance races approved by IAU. IAU operates under the patronage of the World Athletics and follows World Athletics rules.

Events
IAU events include:

See also
 24-hour run
 Ultramarathon
 International Trail Running Association (ITRA)

External links

ULTRAmarathonRunning.com Global Ultramarathon Races & Events Calendar

Ultramarathons
Athletics organizations
Endurance games